Mylothris citrina is a butterfly in the family Pieridae. It is found in Uganda, the Democratic Republic of Congo and Tanzania. The habitat consists of forests.

Subspecies
Mylothris citrina citrina (north-eastern Tanzania)
Mylothris citrina holochroma Talbot, 1944 (Democratic Republic of Congo)
Mylothris citrina orientalis Talbot, 1946 (Uganda)

References

Seitz, A. Die Gross-Schmetterlinge der Erde 13: Die Afrikanischen Tagfalter. Plate XIII 12

Butterflies described in 1898
Pierini
Butterflies of Africa
Taxa named by Per Olof Christopher Aurivillius